David Kaplan is an American columnist, radio and television personality who currently co-hosts Kap and J. Hood weekday mornings from 7:00 a.m. to 10:00 a.m. CST on ESPN 1000.   He also has a highly popular YouTube page where he posts what he has popularized as the reKAP after every Cubs, White Sox, Bears and other Chicago and major sporting events.

Early life and career
Kaplan grew up in Skokie, Illinois and is a graduate of Hamline University in St. Paul, Minnesota, where he received a bachelor's degree in English.

Basketball career
He was an assistant on head coach John McDougal's staff at Northern Illinois University from 1982 to 1986 for NIU's Men's Basketball Team. He was also a scout for two NBA teams: the Indiana Pacers and the Seattle SuperSonics.

Broadcasting career
Kaplan worked at Chicago sports radio station WMVP-AM before joining WGN (AM)'s sports staff as a reporter in 1995.

He became the host of Sports Central at WGN in 1995 and it quickly became Chicago radio's #1 rated sports talk show. He and former Chicago Bears star Tom Waddle co-hosted the show for just over 10 years which at the time was the longest on air sports talk duo in Chicago radio history. After Waddle left to join ESPN Radio in February 2007, Kaplan hosted the show on a solo basis until March 2010.  It was the longest-running sports talk show in Chicago (began in 1982), until March 2010 when the former Program Director Kevin Metheny, who was characterized in the Howard Stern movie Private Parts as Kenny "Pig Vomit" Rushton opted to replace the program with a non-sports oriented talk show.  In December 2010, after the removal of Metheny,  Kaplan signed a new long-term contract to stay at WGN Radio as the primary host of a new evening talk show called WGN Sports Night.

In January 2008, Kaplan was named the host of Chicago Tribune Live on Comcast SportsNet. In November 2009, he and the staff of "Chicago Tribune Live" were awarded the prestigious Emmy Award for Best Interview Program for their work on CTL. In 2013, this show changed its name to Sports Talk Live, which Kaplan hosted for several years until it was cancelled by the pandemic in August 2020.

He has also appeared as a guest on The Oprah Winfrey Show and he was in the documentary Hoop Dreams during his basketball scouting days.

In November 2012, Kaplan was hired by the NBC Sports Network to call college basketball games after a long stint as a basketball announcer for ESPN.

He was the co-host of the Kap and Haugh show on Comcast SportsNet Chicago which aired from 2013 to 2015. He partnered with longtime Chicago Tribune lead sports columnist David Haugh on this show.

Kaplan hosted the pre game and post game shows for the Chicago Cubs on either radio (WGN Radio) or TV for 25 seasons from 1995 to 2019. He was the former pre and postgame host for NBC Sports Chicago's Chicago Cubs broadcasts where he partnered with former Chicago Cubs outfielder Todd Hollandsworth, former Chicago Cubs outfielder David DeJesus and former Cubs outfielder Doug Glanville.

He also calls college basketball games for various conferences including the Atlantic 10 Conference on NBCSN, the Missouri Valley Conference, the Horizon League and several others. Kaplan has also been the announcer for the Chicago Machine and Chicago Shamrox.

On March 28, 2022, NBC Sports Chicago announced that Kaplan will host a new thirty minute weeknight sports talk show on NBC Sports Chicago that will debut on April 4, 2022, titled "Unfiltered with David Kaplan" and it will air at 6 PM. In November of 2022, Kaplan announced he would be leaving NBC Sports Chicago at the end of the year, choosing to focus on his ESPN radio show and growing YouTube channel.

ESPN
In 2011, Kaplan played a prominent role in the ESPN documentary Catching Hell which chronicled the story of the 2003 Chicago Cubs and fan Steve Bartman who was thrust into the spotlight when the Cubs failed to win Game 6 of the National League Championship Series after leading 3–0 in the eighth inning at Wrigley Field.

He has worked extensively as a basketball game analyst for ESPN.

After a 21-year career at WGN Radio, Kaplan signed a multi-year deal with ESPN in 2015 and he started as the host of Kap and Co., a daily sports radio show that aired on ESPN 1000 in Chicago from 9:00 AM CT until noon. His co-hosts included US Hockey Hall of Famer Eddie Olczyk who is also the color analyst of the Chicago Blackhawks TV broadcasts and the NHL on NBC in addition to his horse racing analysis on NBC Sports. Jordan Cornette was a co-host with Kaplan before he moved to Bristol, CT to work for ESPN and the ACC Network. Cornette's wife, Shae Peppler Cornette also co-hosted with Kaplan. He also worked with NBC Sports Chicago broadcaster Pat Boyle. Currently, Kaplan co-hosts "Kap and J. Hood" with Jonathan Hood on ESPN 1000 from 7:00 to 10:00 AM CT. His charisma paired with J. Hood, has successfully garnered productive and entertaining conversation on Chicago's sports teams every morning.

Awards
Kaplan was named to the prestigious Chicagoland Sports Hall of Fame in 2021. He has won three Emmy Awards for his television work including 2 at Comcast SportsNet and 1 for hosting the highly successful A Piece of the Game which is a sports memorabilia show that airs nationally and has received multiple awards for excellence. In addition, he co-authored the award-winning  "Around Town" column in the Chicago Tribune with longtime writer Fred Mitchell from 2009 to 2011. He was inducted into the prestigious WGN Radio Walk of Fame in May 2018. He was also inducted into the Illinois Basketball Coaches (IBCA) Hall of Fame and the Chicago Public League Basketball Coaches Hall of Fame in 2017.

He is the only person in Chicago media history to host a daily TV show, a daily radio show and write a regular column in a major newspaper all at the same time.

Personal life
Kaplan is married to Mindy Kaplan, an executive with the Lou Malnati's chain of Chicago style pizzerias. Kaplan has a son, Brett, and three stepsons Nicholas, Alexander and Garret. He and his family are dog lovers and they have three dogs, a Siberian Husky named Sparky and two rescue black labs Yoshi and Stanley.

References

External links
 YouTube channel

1960 births
Living people
Lacrosse announcers
College football announcers
Major League Baseball broadcasters
College basketball announcers in the United States
American television personalities
Male television personalities
People from Skokie, Illinois
Hamline University alumni
Radio personalities from Chicago